SK Rakovník is a Czech football club from the town of Rakovník in the Central Bohemian Region. The club currently plays in the Bohemian Football League, which is the third tier of the Czech football system. The club played two seasons in the Czechoslovak First League.

History
The club was founded in 1903 as Sportovní kroužek Rakovník, before changing to simply SK Rakovník the following year, following which they competed under the name until 1948. Rakovník took part in the top level of Czech football for the first time in the 1942–43 season. Their second and final season in the Czechoslovak First League was in 1945–46.

Historical names
 1903 – Sportovní kroužek Rakovník
 1904 – SK Rakovník
 1949 – Sokol Rakovník KZ
 1951 – Sokol TOS Rakovník
 1953 – Spartak Rakovník
 1958 – Lokomotiva Rakovník
 1967 – ČKZ Rakovník
 1968 – SK Rakovník
 1973 – ČKZ Rakovník
 1991 – SK Rakovník

References

External links
 

Football clubs in the Czech Republic
Czechoslovak First League clubs
Association football clubs established in 1903
Rakovník District